Ventricina is a pork sausage commonly found in the Abruzzo region of central Italy. It is similar to certain luncheon meats, included in the category English-speakers from the United States refer to as "cold cuts". It is traditionally made using relatively low grade, very fatty pig meat cuts and encasing them in the animal's intestines or stomach while they cure. There are two principal types of ventricina: those of the area in and around the city of Teramo, and others coming from the area of Vasto. It is included in the Slow Food movement Ark of Taste, an international catalogue of endangered heritage foods.

Teramo ventricina
This version of ventricina is made from pork meat with added pork fat, the latter amounting to approximately 50–60% by weight of the finished product. The meat and fat are finely ground together and various spices are then added to the mixture. Most often these include garlic, salt, ground black and white pepper, hot and bell peppers, orange peel, rosemary, bell pepper paste, and fennel seeds. Other spices are sometimes added according to the taste of the producer. Traditionally, this mixture would be encased in the bladder, stomach, or intestines of the pig. More recently, synthetic casings have been employed or the mixture is simply stored in glass containers. Ventricina is often hung to cure in a cool dark place for several months before it is eaten.  Ventricina teramana (that from the area around Teramo in Abruzzo) is most often eaten when it is young and has been allowed to age only a few months.  Many people spread this delicacy on an open slice of bread. If desired the bread slices can be placed on the grill or in the oven for a period of time, thereby making a kind of bruschetta.

Vasto ventricina
In comparison to the Teramo ventricina, that made in Vasto contains a much lower percentage of fat, typically in the neighborhood of 30% or so. The meat in this ventricina is cut into larger cubes of about two centimeters.  Spices include bell peppers, hot peppers, fennel seeds and ground pepper.

External links
La ventricina del Vastese 
Ventricina Teramana 

Italian cuisine
Lunch meat
Salumi
Cuisine of Abruzzo